Yu Wai Lim (born 20 September 1998) is a Hong Kong professional footballer who currently plays as a defender for Hong Kong Premier League club Lee Man.

Club career
On 17 July 2016, Yuen Long confirmed the signing of Yu.

On 17 July 2018, Yu was named as one of fourteen new players at Lee Man.

International career
On 11 June 2021, Yu made his international debut for Hong Kong in the match against Iraq in the AFC World Cup Qualifiers.

Career statistics

International

Honours

Club
Tai Po
 Hong Kong First Division League: 2015–16
Yuen Long	
 Hong Kong Senior Shield: 2017–18
Lee Man
 Hong Kong Sapling Cup: 2018–19

International
Hong Kong
 Guangdong-Hong Kong Cup: 2019

References

External links

Yu Wai Lim at HKFA

1998 births
Living people
Hong Kong footballers
Hong Kong international footballers
Association football defenders
Tai Po FC players
Yuen Long FC players
Lee Man FC players
Hong Kong First Division League players
Hong Kong Premier League players